Equestrian at the 2012 Summer Paralympics consisted of 11 dressage events. The competitions was held in the Greenwich Park from 30 August to 4 September.

Classification
Riders were given a classification depending on the type and extent of their disability. The classification system allowed riders to compete against others with a similar level of function.

Equestrian classes were:
I, for riders with impaired limb function, or poor balance and good upper limb function
II, for riders with locomotion impairment
III, for blind riders with moderate locomotion impairment
IV, for riders with some visual impairment or impaired function in one or two limbs

Events
For each of the events below, medals were contested for one or more of the above classifications. After each classification are given the dates that the event was contested. All events were mixed, meaning that men and women competed together.

Mixed individual championship
 Grade Ia
 Grade Ib
 Grade II
 Grade III
 Grade IV
Mixed individual freestyle
 Grade Ia
 Grade Ib
 Grade II
 Grade III
 Grade IV
Mixed team

Officials
Appointment of officials is as follows:

Dressage
  Kjell Myhre (Ground Jury President)
  Liliana Iannone (Ground Jury Member)
  Anne Prain (Ground Jury Member)
  Sarah Rodger (Ground Jury Member)
  Freddy Leyman (Ground Jury Member)
  Gudrun Hofinga (Ground Jury Member)
  Carlos Lopes (Ground Jury Member)

Participating nations
78 riders from 27 nations competed.

Medal table

Medal summary

Medalists

References

External links
Official website of the 2012 Summer Paralympics 
Official Paralympics website
FEI:Fédération Equestre Internationale

 
2012
2012 Summer Paralympics events
Equestrian sports competitions in the United Kingdom
2012 in equestrian
Para Dressage